Penland may refer to:

Penland (surname)
Penland, North Carolina
Penland School of Crafts